Police General Hospital is a hospital located in Pathum Wan District, Bangkok, Thailand. It is a police hospital for the Royal Thai Police and a teaching hospital for HRH Princess Chulabhorn College of Medical Science, the Faculty of Medicine, Srinakharinwirot University as well as the Royal Thai Police Nursing College.

History 
In 1897, a hospital was constructed near Phlapphla Chai for the treatment of sexually transmitted infections in prostitutes in the area. The following year, the hospital was renamed Patrol Hospital and assigned to the Royal Thai Police Medical Division as a police hospital and as a place that official autopsies could be conducted. In 1915 the hospital was renamed Klang Hospital and was reassigned to the Medical Services Division of the Ministry of the Interior. The police's medical division was moved to the Phra Ratchawang Metropolitan Police Station on Sanam Chai Road.

In 1952, the division was elevated to a hospital status and renamed Police General Hospital and was allocated a site on Rama I Road in the grounds of the Royal Thai Police Headquarters. In 1979, the Medical Division became the Office of the Surgeon General, with Police General Hospital becoming one of its units.

It was previously a teaching hospital for the School of Medicine, Siam University between 2013 and 2015.

See also 
 Healthcare in Thailand
 Hospitals in Thailand
 List of hospitals in Thailand

References 

 This article incorporates material from the corresponding article in the Thai Wikipedia

Hospitals in Bangkok
Royal Thai Police